The Principality of Lucca and Piombino was created in July 1805 by Napoleon I for his beloved sister Elisa Bonaparte. It was a State located on the central Italian Peninsula (present-day Italy), reporting to the needs of Napoleonic France.

Formation
The state was the result of the annexation of the Principality of Lucca (est. 22 June 1805), the former Republic of Lucca and occupied by France since late 1799, and the ancient Principality of Piombino, with Elisa the Princess of Piombino since that March. The combined principalities then were ruled as a single monarchy. Elisa was the ruling Princess of Piombino and Lucca. Her husband Felice Pasquale Baciocchi became the titular Prince of Piombino.

Rule
The Constitution of the principality was written by Napoleon on 22 June (1805), establishing a Council of State to assist the Princess and a legislative Senate.

The Principality adopted the French franc as its currency, though few special local coins were minted.

On 3 March 1809, as part of the Treaty of Fontainebleau, her brother Napoleon created the Grand Duchy of Tuscany, with Elisa ruling as Grand Duchess of all Tuscany from Florence. The region had been annexed to the French Empire two years before, from the former Kingdom of Etruria (1801-1807). Henceforth the Principality of Lucca and Piombino became part of the Grand Duchy of Tuscany, and consequently a territory of the First French Empire. It did have special status, and a prefect was appointed (Antoine-Marie-Pierre de Hautmesnil). However, the territory was never named a Department of France.

End
In 1814, the Imperial Austrian Army occupied Lucca, ending French control with the fall of Napoleon. Under the Congress of Vienna Piombino was given to the Grand Duchy of Tuscany, and Elba to the exiled Napoleon.

Lucca was restored to separate state status as the Duchy of Lucca (1815–1847).  The Congress of Vienna (1814–1815) gave the Duchy to exiled Spanish Borbón Maria Louisa (1782-1824), who became the Duchess of Lucca and disregarded the constitution imposed on her by the Congress and governed in an absolutist fashion.

See also
Villa Reale di Marlia — royal estate of Elisa Bonaparte in the Principality.

Bibliography 
 Claude Drigon, Nouveau traité historique et archéologique de la vraie et parfaite science des armoiries 
L'Univers, histoire et description de tous les peuples 
 Marie Nicolas Bouillet, Dictionnaire universel d'histoire et de géographie, 
 Gérard Hubert, La sculpture dans l'Italie napoléonienne,

External links
 Flags of Lucca
 Constitution of Lucca (in Italian)

Lucca
Lucca
States and territories established in 1805
1805 establishments in Europe
1815 disestablishments in Europe
History of Tuscany